Əhmədağalı is a village and municipality in the Agdam District of Azerbaijan.  It has a population of 2,563.  The municipality consists of the villages of Əhmədağalı, Mirəşelli, and Bənövşələr.

References

External links 

Populated places in Aghdam District